The 2020 Volta a Portugal em Bicicleta Edição Especial was the 82nd edition of the Volta a Portugal road cycling stage race and was held from 27 September to 5 October 2020. Originally, it was due to take place from 29 July to August 8, but it was postponed due to the COVID-19 pandemic. It was a 2.1-rated event on the 2020 UCI Europe Tour and covered  over eight stages.

Teams 
Five UCI ProTeams and the nine Portuguese UCI Continental teams made up the fourteen teams of seven riders each that participated in the race. 89 of the 98 riders in the race finished.

UCI ProTeams

 
 
 
 
 

UCI Continental Teams

Schedule

Stages

Prologue 
27 September 2020 — Fafe,  (ITT)

Stage 1 
28 September 2020 — Montalegre to Viana do Castelo (Alto de Santa Luzia),

Stage 2 
29 September 2020 — Paredes to Alto da Senhora da Graça,

Stage 3 
30 September 2020 — Felgueiras to Viseu,

Stage 4 
1 October 2020 — Guarda to Covilhã (Torre),

Stage 5 
2 October 2020 — Oliveira do Hospital to Águeda,

Stage 6 
3 October 2020 — Caldas da Rainha to Torres Vedras,

Stage 7 
4 October 2020 — Loures to Setúbal,

Stage 8 
5 October 2020 — Lisbon to Lisbon,  (ITT)

Classification leadership 

 On stage 3, Gustavo César, who was second in the points classification, wore the red jersey, because first placed Amaro Antunes wore the yellow jersey as the leader of the general classification.

Final classification standings

General classification

Points classification

Mountains classification

Young rider classification

Portuguese rider classification

Teams classification

References

Sources

External links 
 

2020
Volta a Portugal
Volta a Portugal
Volta a Portugal
Volta a Portugal